Prud (Cyrillic: Пруд) is a village in the municipalities of Odžak (Federation of Bosnia and Herzegovina) and Šamac (Republika Srpska), Bosnia and Herzegovina. The Šamac part of the village has been renamed Njegoševo.

Demographics 
According to the 2013 census, its population was 941, all of them living in the Odžak part,

References

Populated places in Odžak